The Saab 105 is a Swedish high-wing, twinjet trainer aircraft developed in the early 1960s as a private venture by Saab AB. The Swedish Air Force, which had opted to procure the type for various roles, issued the aircraft with the designation Sk 60. The Sk 60 entered service in 1967, replacing the ageing De Havilland Vampire fleet.

The Swedish Air Force bought a total of 150 aircraft and another 40 were exported to Austria, designated Saab 105Ö. The Saab 105 is also the aircraft used by Swedish Air Force display team Team 60 and was formerly used by two display teams of the Austrian Air Force, "Karo As" and "Silver Birds".

Development
In 1959, development of what would be subsequently designated as the Saab 105 was initiated by Saab. The company had decided to develop the aircraft as a private venture and intended for the type to be capable of serving in a wide variety of military and civil capacities. In a military capacity, the 105 can be operated as a jet trainer, conduct aerial reconnaissance and ground attack, and a limited interceptor capability. Amongst the diverse roles planned for the aircraft, Saab proposed a four-to-five seat business jet cabin configuration which was intended to be used by corporate customers. At the time, the 105 was one of the only small European aircraft to be equipped with turbofan, which was reported as of interest to prospective business customers. The 105 was intended to launch Saab into the business jet market; however, ultimately no such customers emerged for the type and thus Saab elected to focus its interest upon military customers instead.

Early on, the Swedish Air Force had formed a commitment with Saab that, contingent upon satisfactory performance of the prototype during flight testing, that an order for at least 100 aircraft would be placed. In December 1961, the Swedish Government announced that it had authorized the Swedish Air Force to sponsor the development and manufacture of a single prototype Saab 105 in a training configuration.  On 29 June 1963, this first prototype conducted its maiden flight. The flight test program soon revealed the type to have good handling qualities and to be capable of performing aerobatic maneuvers. In March 1965, a single prototype was dispatched to Turbomeca's facilities in Pau, Pyrénées-Atlantiques, Aquitaine, France, for further flight testing of its Turbomeca Aubisque powerplant.

On 6 March 1965, the Swedish Air Force received authorisation from the Swedish Government to place an order for an initial quantity of 130 Saab 105 aircraft. The Swedish aircraft were divided into three principal variants, these being the Sk 60A for training and liaison duties using a four-seat configuration, the Sk 60B for light attack missions in a twin side-by-side seating configuration, and the Sk 60C dual-role attack and reconnaissance aircraft, equipped with various cameras in the aircraft's nose for the latter role.

An improved version, designated as the Saab 105Ö, was procured by Austria as a lightweight multi-role aircraft with the intention to deploy them in trainer, reconnaissance, interception and ground attack roles. In order to meet the requirements specified by the Austrian Air Force, the 105Ö features several key differences, which includes some avionics changes, the adoption of a strengthened wing for carrying greater quantities of munitions and equipment upon the underwing hardpoints, and a more powerful version of the Turbomeca Aubisque powerplant, which provided superior performance when operated from air bases at high altitude.

Design

The Saab 105 was developed to function as a small and inexpensive multirole aircraft, which has been most typically used in a training capacity. It is an all-metal twin-jet aircraft with a pressurized cabin. It features a T-tail configuration, modestly swept wings, and a pair of engines mounted on either side of the fuselage just underneath the wing.

The 105 can be outfitted with various armaments and equipment to perform a wide range of duties, most of which would be installed upon the aircraft's six underwing hardpoints. In a ground-attack/close air support capacity, the 105 can employ a combination of 135 mm, 127 mm, and 75 mm unguided rockets, air-to-ground missiles and assorted bombs, including napalm bombs; either a pair of 30 mm cannon or 7.62 mm guns may be installed using a series of gun pods. In the air defense role, AIM-9 Sidewinder air-to-air missiles can be employed in addition to the cannons. Additionally, for the purpose of carrying a maximum of two passengers, smaller ejector seats can be installed for the pilot and co-pilot while a small bench directly behind them can be used by the passengers. Generic and more specialized surveillance/reconnaissance missions can also be performed by the Saab 105, having the option of being fitted with radiation detection equipment for atmospheric sampling. With suitable equipment, the 105 could be readily converted between trainer and light attack roles.

As built, the Saab 105 was typically powered by a pair of Turbomeca Aubisque low-bypass turbofan engines, licence-manufactured by Volvo Flygmotor as the RM9. The Aubisque engine reportedly provided favourable engine-out characteristics, allowing the aircraft to proceed to successfully takeoff in the event of a single engine failing at the critical point. This has not been the sole powerplant for the type, as a number of 105 aircraft have been powered by the General Electric J85 engine instead. Swedish Air Force aircraft have been remanufactured during the 1990s to use the newer Williams International FJ44, which has been designated as the RM15.

Operational history

In July 1967, the first Swedish Air Force student pilots started training on the Saab 105.  In July 1970, Austrian Air Force pilot training activities on the type formally commenced; by August 2010, 22 of Austria's Saab 105 aircraft remained operational, attaining a combined total flight time of roughly 1,500 flying hours per year.

During the 1990s, by which point the existing engines of the Swedish Air Force's Sk 60 fleet were considered to be towards the end of their technical and economic lifespan, it was decided to replace the Turbomeca Aubisque engines with newly built Williams International FJ44 engines, which are lighter and less costly to operate.  In November 1993, a contract was signed for the re-engining of 115 aircraft; the number of aircraft to be upgraded was subsequently reduced as a result of cuts to the defence budget. The replacement was performed as a low-cost measure to fulfill the Swedish Air Force's continuing requirement for a primary trainer aircraft. In September 1996, the first of these upgraded aircraft, which had been redesignated as the Sk 60W, was re-delivered to the Swedish Air Force.

In June 2007, Saab signed a long term service agreement with the Austrian Air Force to provide logistics and technical support for their Saab 105Ö fleet for a further 10–15 years. Austria finally retired the Saab 105 on 31 December 2020. In December 2008, Saab received a SKr900 million ($115 million) contract to support extended operations of Sweden's 105 trainer fleet up to mid-2017. In September 2009, a SKr130 million ($18.8 million) contract to deliver a package of cockpit and system upgrades for the Sk 60 aircraft was signed. One goal of this modernisation was increased compatibility with the Saab JAS 39 Gripen, the primary combat aircraft of the Swedish Air Force.

In October 2009, Saab proposed to replace the Swedish Air Force's Sk 60 trainers with the Embraer Super Tucano. In March 2014, the Swedish Air Force publicly acknowledged that it was to begin studying replacement options for the Saab 105; Major General Micael Bydén observed that multinational training opportunities were being examined and that prospective replacement aircraft include the Alenia Aermacchi M-346, BAE Systems Hawk and Pilatus PC-21. On 28 March 2014, Saab and Pilatus Aircraft signed a memorandum of understanding to offer the PC-21 to the Swedish Air Force. On 29 April 2015, a request for information (RFI) was issued by the Defence Materiel Administration (FMV) for a new Military Flying Training System to provide long term basic and advanced training fleet functions; the advanced trainer requirements specify the presence of an embedded training capability including simulated radar and weapons use, as well as tactical displays in both cockpit positions resembling fourth and fifth-generation jet fighter aircraft.

In 2020 Saab signed a new service agreement with the Swedish Armed Forces to provide support for the Saab 105 to 2025, with one year option to 2026. In May 2021 the Grob G 120TP was chosen to be the new basic trainer for the Swedish Air force with first airplanes to be operational in 2023.

Variants

 Saab 105
 Prototype. Two built.
 Sk 60A
 Two-seat jet trainer, liaison aircraft for the Swedish Air Force.  149 built as Sk 60A.
 Sk 60B
 Two-seat attack version for the Swedish Air Force, modified from Sk 60A with new weapons sight.
 Sk 60C
 Two-seat ground attack/reconnaissance version for the Swedish Air Force with extended camera nose.  One new-build prototype and 29 conversions from Sk 60A.
 Sk 60D
 Saab had also designed the Saab 105 for use as a four-seat liaison transport: the two ejection seats could be removed and quickly replaced with four airline-type seats, with no provision for wearing a parachute; or four more austere seats that allowed the wearing of parachutes. In the mid-1970s, ten SK 60A aircraft were permanently configured as transports and given the designation of "SK 60D". Some were painted in the light green/dark green/tan "splinter" camouflage associated with the Saab Viggen fighter.
 Sk 60E
 This variant was a similar four-seat SK 60A conversion, but featured commercial-type instruments, including an instrument landing system.  It was used to help train Flygvapnet reserve pilots in flying commercial aircraft. The Sk 60E machines were eventually used as Sk 60D liaison transports.
 Sk 60W
 In 1993, another upgrade program was initiated to modernize the Sk 60, the most important improvement being fit of twin Williams Rolls FJ44 turbofans with 8.45 kN (861 kgp/1,900 lbf) each and digital engine controls. The new engines not only provide more thrust, but are quieter, cleaner, and easier to maintain. The first Williams-powered Sk 60—known informally as the "Sk 60(W)"—performed its initial flight in August 1995.  A total of about 115 conversions of Sk 60A, 60B, and 60C aircraft were performed in the late 1990s. No conversions were performed of the Sk 60D/E, with all such aircraft grounded and used as spares hulks.
 Saab 105XT
 Export demonstrator; improved version of the Sk 60B, re-engined with 12.68 kN (2,850 lbf) General Electric J85 turbojets. Prototype converted from second Saab 105 prototype.
 Saab 105D
 A refined business jet variant was considered, but the idea was out of date and there were no takers.
 Saab 105G
 Revised version of 105XT with new avionics, including precision nav/attack system, more powerful J85 engines and modified wing. One converted from 105 XT prototype.
 Saab 105H
 Proposed version for the Swiss Air Force. Never built.
 Saab 105Ö
 Variant of the 105XT for the Austrian Air Force, first delivered to Austria in July 1970. 40 built, delivered 1970–72, replacing the de Havilland Vampire and Saab 29 Tunnan.
 Saab 105S
 In the mid-1970s, Saab proposed yet another demonstrator, the "Saab 105S" for a Finnish trainer requirement, but the Finns decided to buy the BAe Hawk instead.

Operators
  Austria
 Austrian Air Force: 40. All retired on 31st of December 2020 after 50 years of service
  Sweden 
 Swedish Air Force: 72.

Specifications (Saab 105Ö)

See also

References

Citations

Bibliography

 Allport, Dave. "Austria Retires Saab 105s". Air International, February 2021, Vol. 100, No. 2. p. 11. 
 Chant, Christopher. A Compendium of Armaments and Military Hardware. London: Routledge, 2014. .
 Eliasson, Gunnar. Advanced Public Procurement as Industrial Policy: The Aircraft Industry as a Technical University. Springer Science & Business Media, 2010. .
 Hewson, Robert. "Saab 105/Sk60 Variant Briefing". World Air Power Journal, Volume 23 Winter 1995. London:Aerospace Publishing. . ISSN 0959-7050. pp. 40–49.
 Phillips, Almarin and A. Paul Phillips, Thomas R. Phillips. Biz Jets: Technology and Market Structure in the Corporate Jet Aircraft Industry. Springer Science & Business Media, 2012. .
 Michell, Simon (ed.) Jane's Civil and Military Upgrades 1994–95. Coulsdon, UK: Jane's Information Group, 1994. .
 Rendall, David. Jane's Aircraft Recognition Guide. Harper Collins, Glasgow, 1996.

External links

 Saab 105Ö (Austrian Air Force)
 Tigerstaffel AUSTRIA (Austrian Air Force. Includes a 3D model of the Saab 105)

105
1960s Swedish military trainer aircraft
Twinjets
T-tail aircraft
High-wing aircraft
Aircraft first flown in 1963